Nathan Ablitt (born 3 March 2004) is a British speedway rider.

Career
On 20 December 2018, it was announced that Ablitt had signed for his first senior club, Kent Kings, and he would ride for them in the National League for the 2019 season. Ablitt helped the Kings win their first ever piece of team silverware when they defeated Isle of Wight Warriors in the final of the National Trophy. On 15 August 2019, after sustaining some injuries, Ablitt decided not to race for the remainder of the 2019 season so was replaced in the Kings team by Jake Mulford.

Ablitt signed for Mildenhall Fen Tigers ahead of the 2020 season. However, Ablitt never made an appearance for the Fen Tigers with the 2020 season being cancelled due to the COVID-19 pandemic.

On 8 March 2021, Ablitt signed for his local National League team, Eastbourne Seagulls, who he had also signed for as an asset in August the previous year. After an impressive start to the season with the Seagulls, Ablitt joined Eastbourne's main team, Eastbourne Eagles who compete in the SGB Championship, as a replacement for Jason Edwards.

In 2022, he rode for the Poole Pirates in the SGB Championship 2022 and Belle Vue Colts during the 2022 National Development League speedway season. As part of the Poole team he helped them retain their tier 2 League and 2 KO Cup double crown.

In 2023, he signed for Kent Royals for the 2023 National Development League speedway season.

References

Living people
2004 births
British speedway riders
Belle Vue Colts riders
Eastbourne Eagles riders
Kent Kings riders
Mildenhall Fen Tigers riders
Poole Pirates riders